Natasha Mozgovaya (born 1979) is an American-Israeli journalist. She is a TV host for Voice of America.

Biography 

Natasha Mozgovaya was born in the Soviet Union in 1979 into a family of Jewish journalists, and immigrated to Israel in 1990. At the age of 11, she published her first piece in a Russian newspaper. At 14, she was writing a weekly satiric column for the Russian-Israeli newspaper Vesti. In time she advanced to become editor for two supplement magazines at the newspaper and translated several books from Russian to Hebrew. At the age of 12, she won her screen-debut, taking part in advertisements for the Jewish Agency.

Mozgovaya has bachelor's degree in sociology and anthropology and a master's degree in political science from Tel Aviv University .

In 2000, Mozgovaya left Vesti and became a correspondent for Yediot Ahronoth newspaper, covering a broad spectrum of issues in Israel and all over the world. During the presidency of Vladimir Putin, Mozgovaya contributed extensive coverage of the Russian opposition. Meanwhile, she anchored the investigative report TV program "Special Department" on Channel 9, the cultural shows "Osim Ruach" on Channel 1 and Ha-boker ha-Shvii on Channel 2.

From October 2007 she presented the nightly newscast on Channel 9 and starred in the documentary series Tmol Shilshom, that engages in the history of Israel from 1948, each part dedicated to a different year in history of the country. Although working most of the time in Hebrew, her reports in Russian from the Palestinian territories and Israel were published in various magazines and newspapers in Russia, and one of her blogs was chosen twice as "the best blog" in Russian blogosphere and the "Best Journalistic Blog in Russian" by Deutsche Welle in 2004.

In 2008, Mozgovaya left Yedioth Ahronoth to become the Washington Bureau Chief for Haaretz newspaper in Washington, D.C. She was a frequent lecturer on Israel and Middle Eastern affairs in various U.S. universities, communities and think-tanks. She left Haaretz in 2012.

In 2013, Mozgovaya started working at the Voice of America, hosting the daily Current time TV show. In 2013, she contributed columns for the Israeli news portal Walla!. In 2015, she developed and started hosting Briefing, a daily web TV show.

Personal life 
She lives in Maryland with her American-Israeli husband and three children.

References

External links 
 Natasha Mozgovaya Blog in Hebrew
 Natasha Mozgovaya Blog in Russian

1979 births
Living people
Israeli expatriates in the United States
Israeli Jews
Israeli television journalists
Israeli magazine editors
Israeli newspaper editors
Israeli women journalists
Naturalized citizens of Israel
Haaretz people
Soviet emigrants to Israel
Soviet Jews
Tel Aviv University alumni
Women newspaper editors
Yedioth Ahronoth
Voice of America people
Women magazine editors
Women television journalists